Akhtachi Rural District is in the Central District of Bukan County, West Azerbaijan province, Iran. At the National Census of 2006, its population was 7,050 in 1,232 households. There were 8,871 inhabitants in 2,270 households at the following census of 2011. At the most recent census of 2016, the population of the rural district was 9,911 in 2,946 households. The largest of its 26 villages was Kahrizeh-ye Mahmud Aqa, with 4,058 people.

References 

Bukan County

Rural Districts of West Azerbaijan Province

Populated places in West Azerbaijan Province

Populated places in Bukan County